TS2 may refer to:

 Microsoft Train Simulator 2, a train simulator that was being developed by Microsoft Game Studios
 TeamSpeak 2, a proprietary Voice over IP software
 The Sims 2, a 2004 strategic life simulation computer game
 TimeSplitters 2, a 2002 first-person shooter video game
 Toy Story 2, a 1999 American computer-animated comedy film
 TS 2, an Internet service provider for U.S. Army soldiers in Afghanistan
 TS2 (postal code), see TS postcode area

See also

 T2S, a European securities settlement engine
 
 
 TSS (disambiguation)